These are the Billboard magazine Hot 100 number one hits of 1964.

That year, 11 acts achieved their first number one song, such as The Beatles, Louis Armstrong, Mary Wells, The Dixie Cups, Peter and Gordon, The Beach Boys, The Supremes, The Animals, Manfred Mann, The Shangri-Las, and Lorne Greene. Dean Martin, despite already having a song hit number one prior to the creation of the Hot 100, earns his first number one song on the chart. Bobby Vinton, The Beatles, and The Supremes were the only acts to have more than one song hit number one that year, which The Beatles had the most with six.

Chart history

Number-one artists

See also
1964 in music
List of Billboard number-one singles

References

Sources
Fred Bronson's Billboard Book of Number 1 Hits, 5th Edition
Joel Whitburn's Top Pop Singles 1955-2008, 12 Edition
Joel Whitburn Presents the Billboard Hot 100 Charts: The Sixties
Additional information obtained can be verified within Billboard's online archive services and print editions of the magazine.

1964 record charts
1964